Vigo Rendena (Vich in local dialect) was a comune (municipality) in Trentino in the northern Italian region Trentino-Alto Adige/Südtirol, located about  west of Trento. It was merged with Villa Rendena and Darè on January 1, 2016, to form a new municipality, Porte di Rendena.

Vigo Rendena borders the following municipalities: Pelugo, Montagne, Villa Rendena and Darè.

Demographic evolution

References

Cities and towns in Trentino-Alto Adige/Südtirol